Eupithecia syriacata is a moth in the family Geometridae. It is found in Lebanon, Turkey and Syria.

References

Moths described in 1879
syriacata
Moths of Europe
Moths of Asia